Gnadenwald is a municipality in the eastern part of the district Innsbruck country. The village consists of several hamlets and the church villages: St. Martin and St. Michael.

Population

Personalities
Gnadenwald was the birthplace of the Tyrolean nationalist leader and rebel Josef Speckbacher

References

External links
 Town history (German)
 Municipality Gnadenwald: Official website of the municipality in the Hall-Wattens region

Cities and towns in Innsbruck-Land District